True Legend is a 2010 martial arts film directed by Yuen Woo-ping in his first film as directed since 1996. The film stars Vincent Zhao, Zhou Xun, Jay Chou, Michelle Yeoh, Andy On, David Carradine (in his final film role before his death), Guo Xiaodong, Feng Xiaogang, Cung Le, Gordon Liu, Bryan Leung and Jacky Heung.

The film has been shown in both 2D and 3D, and was promoted as the first Chinese 3D film. It was a rather large financial loss for producer Bill Kong, making only RMB 46.5 million (US$6.82 million) against an estimated budget of US$20 million. It was released in the U.S. on May 13, 2011 by the distribution company Indomina, where it grossed US$62,200 during its run.

This was one of Carradine's final performances and it was released posthumously.

Plot
Su Can is a general who leads a military force to save a prince from a large fortress of enemies in the mountains. In return, the prince promises that the Emperor will make him governor of Hubei. Su's step brother Yuan is envious of Su, but Su loves him and asks the prince to make Yuan governor instead. Su wants to leave the military and lead a life pursuing the perfection of wushu, eventually in the hopes of starting his school and teaching his skills. Su gives his great prestigious sword to a comrade Ma, then tells Yuan of his plans. Yuan expresses that he is always in Su's shadow but accepts the governorship. Early next morning, Su leaves on a horse.

Five years later, Su and his wife Ying (Yuan's sister) have a child, Feng. Su's father informs them that Yuan is returning from the military to be a governor. He warns Su that Yuan may not have come back simply to reconcile with family but to seek revenge. This is because years ago, Su's father killed Yuan's father when the latter went too far in learning an evil martial arts technique called the Five Venom Fists. Su's father then took Yuan in, but he harbours concern that Yuan is still vengeful. Su is naive and assures his father that everything will be alright.

When Yuan returns, a homecoming party is held. Yuan greets his sister Ying, Feng, and Su's father. Su's father knows what is impending and asks Yuan to take his revenge on him alone, sparing Su and his family. Using his mastery of the Five Venom Fists, Yuan kills Su's father and decapitates him. He expresses his desire to be with his sister (Ying) and her son Feng as a family. When Su hears the news of his father's murder, he rushes to the scene of his father's death and is attacked by the Iron Twins. He chases them to a rapid where Yuan is offering Su's father's head to his real father's shrine as a symbol of revenge taken. A battle ensues between Yuan and Su. Yuan has a dark armour sewn into his body, making him partially invulnerable to blades. Using his Five Venom Fists, Yuan deals a deadly poisonous blow to Su who is defeated. Feng begs for Su's life and Yuan spares him but throws him into the rapids. Ying jumps into the rapid to save Su and Yuan is heartbroken at the loss of his beloved sister. He takes Feng in as his only family.

Ying awakes in forest area and tries to bring her husband to civilization and safety. They are found by a herb researcher and wine maker, Sister Yu, who treats Su's wounds. Su comes to consciousness but is broken to find his right arm severely weakened with all tendons torn. At first, he is desperate and turns to drinking, but with Ying's support, he focuses on training in order to save Feng. He meets Wu Shu God and an old sage and asks to be their disciple. At a sacred site, he trains with the Wu Shu God for years, always trying to defeat him but never able to. Later, by checking Su's pulse, Dr. Du reveals to Ying that Su is going mad and that there is probably no Wu Shu god or Old Sage since she is the only one living in the area. Ying follows Su into the forest one day and finds him fighting (seemingly) with himself, oblivious to the fact that he is only battling with the Wu Shu god in his mind. Ying pleads with Su to come to his senses but he does not believe her. By the time Su realizes the truth, it is too late. Ying has left to try to save Feng by herself.

At Yuan's palace, Ying is now a captive of Yuan. Su arrives shortly after and fights his way through the guards. He also battles the Iron Twins and with his improved skills, impales both on a podao, a saber like spear. Yuan orders his men to bury Ying alive in a box and then kills the men who buried her so that only he knows her location. A crazed Su battles with Yuan in his training chamber and ultimately defeats him, even gnashing though a poisonous snake in the process. Feng screams that Yuan must not die because only he knows Ying's location, but a maddened Su delivers a fatal blow to Yuan's throat, thus executing him in anger. Realizing the words of Feng, he rushes out and a dying soldier reveals the vague location of Ying. Su and Feng rush to search for her but are too late digging her out. Ying dies from lack of air, and Su goes mad with grief.

The era changes from the dynastic to the colonized. Su has lost his mind after the loss of his wife and the previous delusions he had. A homeless Feng leads his father through the streets by rope and takes care of him. A Kung Fu master is killed in a fighting arena - part of a foreigners' club - leaving Su's old friend, Ma, as leader of the Wu Shu Federation. The arena is a stage below which tigers lurk freely, waiting for any unfortunate fighter to drop below.

In the meantime, Su goes into an inn and creates trouble by stealing wine and countering people bent on stopping him with martial art moves. He then meets a fellow drunkard (the Wu Shu god in disguise) who spars with him and gives him a few philosophical tips. The two of them start using Drunken Fighting (Zui Quan) techniques, and Su regains his sanity. The inn lady calls Ma to deal with Su and Ma recognizes Su. They have a talk and Ma gives Su back his sword. Su asks Ma to take care of Feng since he is unfit to be a father but Feng persists, staying with his father instead.

The next day, Su and Feng show up to support Ma in his arena battle. Su goes about drinking in the club's bar area, oblivious to Ma receiving a serious beating in the ring. When Feng tries to save Ma from being killed, the opposing wrestler grabs Feng and holds him in the air. Feng screams for help from his father. His son's cries awake Su from his drunken state and Su rushes into the arena. As Ma and Feng are being taken out of the arena by bystanders, Su battles and defeats the wrestler. Anthony, owner of a wrestling stable, orders his lot to pour into the arena, resulting in a mismatch of three wrestlers to one (Su). Using the drunken martial arts technique learned from his fellow drunkard in the inn, Su's defeats the fighters although he is heavily injured. At the end of the battle, the other fighters are either dead or unconscious, and only after a vision of Ying and the dramatic cries of Feng in an otherwise silenced arena, does a semi-conscious Su manage to stand up. He is declared the winner.

The film ends with a seemingly restored Su practising his moves of old but with long hair reminiscent of the insane period of his life, with Feng and (presumably, in Su's mind) Ying observing. Su has seemingly found his passion.

Cast
 Vincent Zhao as Su Can / Beggar So
 Zhou Xun as Xiao Ying
 Jay Chou as God of Wushu
 Michelle Yeoh as Sister Yu / Yu Shu Lien
 Andy On as Yuan Lie
 David Carradine as Anton
 Guo Xiaodong as Colonel Ma
 Feng Xiaogang as Pick pocket
 Cung Le as Militia Leader
 Gordon Liu as Old Sage / Drunken God
 Bryan Leung as Su Wan-kun
 Jacky Heung as Imperial Prince / General
 Yan Ni as Bar Owner
 Will Liu as Iron Lad
 Jiang Luxia as Iron Maiden
 Li Zo as Little Feng (age 5)
 Suen Hanwen as Little Feng (age 8)
 Conan Stevens as Malotoff
 Jon Heidenreich as Fighter
 Sylvester Terkay as Elder Scot Brother
 Matt Wiese as Younger Scot Brother
 Dominique Vandenberg as Bald One-Eye

Production
When Yuen Woo Ping was given the script by producer Bill Kong. Bill Kong reportedly recommended Vincent Zhao for the role of Beggar Su. Saying that Zhao has been doing television dramas in recent years and should act more in movies. Yuen Woo Ping after looking through some of Zhao's old works decided to choose him for the lead role. In order to prepare for the role Zhao had to lose up to nine kilograms' worth of weight as he explains "Beggar Su can't be too plump." Zhao also had to take up to 2 months' worth of break dancing classes due to the fact Yuen wanted to have a more rhythmic and modern form of the drunken fist. Yuen originally wanted actor Feng Xiaogang to play the role of Old Sage but due to schedule conflicts Feng had to turn the role down and was given the chance to direct his own scene in the movie where he appears as a Pickpocket in which he teaches Little Feng portrayed by young actor, Suen Hanwen to pickpocket. Despite this Yuen and the producers thought that the scene wasn't needed in the movie and thus the scene was deleted in the final cut of the film instead.

True Legend began shooting in the mountain region in a suburb of Beijing on August 28, 2008 that was quite low-key. Filming wrapped up in late January, 2009. The set of the scene in which Su Can saves the Imperial Prince / General broke an all-time record for the largest set ever built inside a Chinese filming studio. The filming period of this film took five months to complete. While still in pre-production, Yuen Woo Ping and some of his workers took more than four months to scout for possible filming locations. They finally chose Yellow Mountain, Hukou Waterfall of the Yellow River and the traditional Anhui hui-style residences. Yuen Woo Ping preferred to shoot their original structure rather than building it in sound stages, which may look fake.

The scene in which Andy On and Vincent Zhao fights at Hukou Waterfall is said to be the hardest fight scene to shoot in the entire film according to Yuen Woo Ping. Yuen Woo Ping stated,

"The safety issue for that scene was the biggest challenge of the whole movie. The landscape looks magnificent but are very dangerous; there was no chance for us to make any mistakes. We meticulously planned out the whole choreography and tested and rehearsed it for many times before rolling the camera. We also double-wired our talent just to make sure they were completely safe. This fighting sequence took us 15 working days to complete."

The films action choreography has been praised and ridiculed with some saying that the action choreography is unmemorable. Despite this Yuen has explained that he doesn't wish to create too fanciful action sequences and explains that "if it's too fanciful than the audience won't be able to see the moves all that clearly." Instead he wanted to create a mixture of traditional and modern form of martial arts thus the action scenes in which Beggar Su uses his Drunken Fist, he did a lot of modern break dancing.

When asked why the full movie isn't in 3D but around 20 minutes in 3D, Yuen explained that making a 3D film is very expensive and takes a lot of human resources. Yuen added that he hired up to one hundred digital artists in order to convert the two action scenes that he thought were the most important in the movie to be converted into 3D. It took up to six entire months just to convert these two fight scenes into 3D. Despite his efforts, a number of countries who bought the movies distribution rights didn't release the movie in 3D because workers in movie theaters would have to tell the audiences when they should put on their 3D glasses and take it off as there are scenes in between the 3D scenes that are in 2D.

Jay Chou also helped with designing some of the actor's outfits as well.

DVD release
On October 25, 2010, DVD was released in Optimum Home Entertainment in Europe in Region 2.

Reception
Reviewer Peter Bradshaw of The Guardian gave True Legend 2 our of 5 stars, writing that it "boasts some great action scenes. But otherwise it's a slightly plodding account of Chinese myth and legend."

In a review of True Legend for The New York Times, reviewer Mike Hale wrote, "Like so many of the bloated, moralistic epics being pumped out by the Chinese film industry, it maneuvers cardboard characters through a story built almost entirely from aphorisms, scheming and pledges of revenge."

References

External links
 
 
 
 True Legend trailer
 http://www.inbaseline.com/project.aspx?project_id=199274
 http://www.conanstevens.com/acting-movies-tv-film/tall-actor-blog/true-legend.html

Chinese martial arts films
Films set in the Qing dynasty
Films set in China
Films directed by Yuen Woo-ping
Hong Kong 3D films
Chinese 3D films
Martial arts fantasy films
Wushu films
Films scored by Shigeru Umebayashi
2010 martial arts films
2010 films
2010 3D films